HyTest Ltd is a producer of monoclonal antibodies and antigens for the diagnostic industry and research communities all around the world. HyTest is based in Turku, Finland. The company was established in 1994 and has become the global market leader in supplying certain reagents. HyTest is known for its investments in research and development. HyTest supplies for example Troponin I antibodies and HyTest's Troponin complex has been chosen by AACC cTnI Standardization Subcommittee for international reference material which is available from NIST.

History
HyTest Ltd was founded in 1994 as a globally recognised manufacturer of high-quality monoclonal antigens and antibodies for the diagnostics industry. HyTest established a bureau in Shanghai Zhangjiang Hi-Tech Park in 2011.

Products
Some of HyTest's key products:
 Troponin I antibodies and antigens
 BNP antibodies
 NT-proBNP antibodies and antigen
 proBNP antigens
 Adiponectin antibodies and antigen
 Influenza A and B antibodies and antigens
 Cystatin C antibodies and antigens
 PAPP-A antibodies and antigens

Certification

HyTest has a certified ISO 9001:2015 quality system

See also
 Adiponectin
 D-dimer
 Troponin
 Troponin I
 Troponin complex
 Myocardial markers in myocardial infarction
 Troponin test
 Cardiac marker

References

External links
 Hytest

Biotechnology companies established in 1994
Biotechnology companies of Finland
Finnish brands
Research support companies
Medical technology companies of Finland
Pharmaceutical companies established in 1994
1994 establishments in Finland